The Dark Horse, released on May 24, 2005 through Hex Records, is the debut full-length studio album and third release from the Rochester-based hardcore band Achilles. It is the follow-up to the split album Achilles/Engineer and received mostly favourable reviews.

Track listing

Personnel 

Achilles
 Rory van Grol - vocals
 Rob Antonucci - guitar, album artwork, design, photography
 Josh Dillon - bass
 Chris Browne - drums

Studio personnel
 Evan Patterson - production, additional guitar
 Chris Owens - engineering

Release history

Details 
 Recording studio: Headbanging Kill Your Mama Music in Louisville, Kentucky
 Distributor: Lumberjack Mordam Music Group
 Recording type: studio
 Recording mode: stereo
 SPARS code: n/a

References

External links 
 Achilles MySpace
 Achilles PureVolume
 Achilles Last.fm

2005 albums
Achilles (band) albums